Kathmandu Rayzrs FC is a Nepali professional franchise  football club based Kathmandu. The club currently competes in the Nepal Super League, the top flight of football in Nepal.

History
The club was formed in March 2021 after the establishment of Nepal Super League the first ever franchise football league in Nepal, under the supervision of All Nepal Football Association (ANFA). The club played their first match on 24 April 2021 against Lalitpur City F.C.They were able to reach the final and were able to win the tournament 1-0 against Dhangadhi

2021 squad

2022 squad

Head coaching record

Technical staff

Team position by years
NSL, 2021: Champions

Honours 
 Nepal Super League
 Champions (1): 2021

References 

2020–21 in Nepalese football
Association football clubs established in 2021
2021 establishments in Nepal
Nepal Super League
Football clubs in Nepal
Sport in Kathmandu